Stefano Travaglia was the defending champion but chose not to defend his title.

Matteo Arnaldi won the title after defeating Francesco Maestrelli 6–3, 6–7(7–9), 6–4 in the final.

Seeds

Draw

Finals

Top half

Bottom half

References

External links
Main draw
Qualifying draw

Internazionali di Tennis d'Abruzzo - 1
Internazionali di Tennis d'Abruzzo